The Museum für Abgüsse Klassischer Bildwerke ("Museum of Casts of Classical Statues") is located in the central Maxvorstadt district in Munich, Bavaria, Germany. It is situated, with a number of other cultural institutions, within the Münchner Haus der Kulturinstitute in Katharina-von-Bora-Straße, near the Königsplatz.

External links 

 
 Review at inzumi.com: Museum for Casts of Classical Sculptures

Maxvorstadt
Museums in Munich